Johann Heinrich Köselitz (10 January 1854 – 15 August 1918) was a German author and composer. He is known for his longtime friendship with Friedrich Nietzsche, who gave him the pseudonym Peter Gast.

Life 

Köselitz was born in Annaberg, Saxony to Gustav Hermann Köselitz (1822–1910), the vice mayor (Vizebürgermeister), and his wife Caroline (1819–1900), a native of Vienna. His younger brother was the painter Rudolf Köselitz.

From 1872, Köselitz studied music with Ernst Friedrich Richter at the University of Leipzig. He transferred in 1875 to the University of Basel, where he attended the lectures of Jacob Burckhardt, Franz Overbeck, and Friedrich Nietzsche. In 1877, Köselitz sharply criticized  the Basel music instructor Selmar Bagge in a newspaper article, which led to a minor scandal.

In Basel, a friendship developed between Köselitz and Nietzsche. Köselitz read for Nietzsche during the latter's intermittent spells of near blindness, and also took dictation. Köselitz was instrumental in the preparation of all of Nietzsche's works after 1876, reviewing the printer's manuscript and sometimes intervening to finalize the text formatting. Nietzsche's break with Wagner and his search for a 'southern' aesthetic with which he could immunize himself from the gloomy German north led him to over-appreciate Köselitz as a musician: 'I should not know how to get along without Rossini; even less, without my own south in music, the music of my Venetian maëstro Pietro Gast. As an amanuensis, however, Köselitz really was invaluable; writing apropos Human, All Too Human, Nietzsche claimed that Gast 'wrote and also corrected: fundamentally, he was really the writer whereas I was merely the author'. All the while, Köselitz worshipped his teacher,  assisting him to the point of self-denial.

In the spring of 1881, while staying together in Recoaro, Nietzsche created the pseudonym 'Peter Gast' for Köselitz. This was the name he was known by among the Nietzsche circle, as well as being the name under which he published all his operas. The name itself is possibly a reference to Mozart's opera Don Giovanni, with its stone guest (Petrus "stone" in Latin, Gast "guest" in German). Peter Gast's most ambitious musical work is the comic opera in three acts The Lion of Venice (Der Löwe von Venedig). Throughout the 1880s, Gast and Nietzsche attempted without success to bring it to performance. It premiered in February 1891 in Danzig under the direction of Carl Fuchs, who exchanged letters with Nietzsche, but under its original title The Secret Wedding (Die heimliche Ehe or Il matrimonio segreto). In the 1930s, it would be shown once again under the title Nietzsche suggested, The Lion of Venice.

Köselitz was financed by his father, and also intermittently supported by Nietzsche's friend Paul Rée. In addition to being a musician and the editor of Nietzsche's writings and letters, he worked as a writer under various pseudonyms, including: Ludwig Mürner, Peter Schlemihl, Petrus Eremitus. He sent articles to many newspapers, and also wrote several short stories and fables.

Notes

References 
 Friedrich Götz. Peter Gast – der Mensch, der Künstler, der Gelehrte. Ein Lebensbild in Quellen. Annaberg, 1934. 

1854 births
1918 deaths
19th-century classical composers
20th-century classical composers
German opera composers
Male opera composers
People from Annaberg-Buchholz
People from the Kingdom of Saxony
German Romantic composers
German male classical composers
20th-century German composers
19th-century German composers
20th-century German male musicians
19th-century German male musicians